Wally Hancock was an Australian rugby league footballer who played in the 1920s. He played in the NSWRFL premiership for North Sydney as a lock and also as a second rower.

Playing career
Hancock began his first grade career with Norths in 1922 and was a part of North Sydney's second premiership win playing at lock in their 35-3 1922 grand final victory over Glebe at the Sydney Cricket Ground.  

Hancock played a further 4 seasons before retiring at the end of the 1926 season.

References

North Sydney Bears players
Rugby league locks
Rugby league second-rows
Year of birth missing
Year of death missing
Rugby league players from Sydney